Melitaea is a genus of brush-footed butterflies (family Nymphalidae). They are here placed in the tribe Melitaeini of subfamily Nymphalinae; some authors elevate this tribe to subfamily rank.

As delimited here, Melitaea includes the genus Mellicta, making the subtribe Melitaeina monotypic (but see below). For long, it was believed that Mellicta was a junior objective synonym of Melitaea, sharing the same type species (the Glanville fritillary, M. cinxia). This was in error, however; the type species of Mellicta is actually the heath fritillary (M. athalia), making the two taxa junior subjective synonyms and thus eligible to be separated again. However, several other taxa are in fact objective synonyms (or at least have type specimens belonging to the same biological species) of Melitaea and Mellicta – Schoenis and the preoccupied Lucina and Melinaea for the former, Athaliaeformia for the latter.

Taxonomy 

As noted above, Mellicta is considered to be a subgenus of Melitaea for the time being. The rationale is that even though the Melitaeina may not be monotypic, they do not seem to consist of just two genera (Melitaea and Mellicta) either, and recognition of Mellicta appears to leave Melitaea paraphyletic; consequently, other lineages would need elevation to distinct genus status also. As long as it is not fully known which species groups and/or subgenera warrant recognition as full genera, they are all retained in the present genus.

Species 
In the following list, species-group/subgenus affiliation and type species are annotated. In the sensu lato circumscription used here, Melitaea contains almost ninety species. Most being assignable to one of the five groups/subgenera, there are a few that cannot be clearly placed with one of these at present:
<div float="left">

didyma/Didymaeformia group Melitaea abyssinica Oberthür, 1909
 Melitaea acraeina (Staudinger, 1886)
 Melitaea agar Oberthür, 1888
 Melitaea ala Staudinger, 1881
 Melitaea alraschid Higgins, 1941
 Melitaea ambrisia Higgins, 1935
 Melitaea arduinna (Esper, 1783) – Freyer's fritillary
 Melitaea athene Staudinger, 1881
 Melitaea avinovi Sheljuzhko, 1914
 Melitaea casta (Kollar, [1848])
 Melitaea chitralensis Moore, 1901
 Melitaea deserticola Oberthür, 1909 – desert fritillary
 Melitaea didyma (Esper, 1778) – spotted fritillary, red-band fritillary (type of Didymaeformis)
 Melitaea didymina Staudinger, 1895
 Melitaea didymoides Eversmann, 1847
 Melitaea enarea Fruhstorfer, 1917
 Melitaea fergana Staudinger, 1882
 Melitaea infernalis Grum-Grshimailo, 1891
 Melitaea interrupta Kolenati, 1846
 Melitaea jitka Weiss & Major, 2000
 Melitaea kotshubeji Sheljuzhko, 1929
 Melitaea latonigena Eversmann, 1847
 Melitaea lunulata Staudinger, 1901
 Melitaea lutko Evans, 1932
 Melitaea meherparvari Carbonell, 2007
 Melitaea mimetica Higgins, 1940
 Melitaea mixta Evans, 1912
 Melitaea ninae Sheljuzhko, 1935
 Melitaea persea Kollar, [1850]
 Melitaea pseudoala Sheljuzhko, 1928
 Melitaea robertsi Butler, 1880 – Baluchi fritillary
 Melitaea romanovi Grum-Grshimailo, 1891
 Melitaea sarvistana Wiltshire, 1941
 Melitaea saxatilis Christoff, 1876
 Melitaea shandura Evans, 1924
 Melitaea sutschana Staudinger, 1892
 Melitaea trivia Denis & Schiffermüller, 1775 – lesser spotted fritillary, desert fritillary
 Melitaea yuenty Oberthür, 1888cinxia/Melitaea sensu stricto group Melitaea amoenula C. & R.Felder, [1867]
 Melitaea arcesia Bremer, 1861 – blackvein fritillary
 Melitaea balbita Moore, 1874
 Melitaea bellona Leech, [1892]
 Melitaea cinxia (Linnaeus, 1758) – Glanville fritillary (type of Melitaea)
 Melitaea diamina (Lang, 1789) – false-heath fritillary
 Melitaea jezabel Oberthür, 1888
 Melitaea protomedia Ménétriés, 1859
 Melitaea sindura Moore, 1865minerva group Melitaea asteroidea Staudinger, 1881
 Melitaea balba Evans, 1912
 Melitaea elisabethae Avinoff, 1910
 Melitaea ludmilla Churkin, Kolesnichenko & Tuzov, 2000
 Melitaea minerva Staudinger, 1881
 Melitaea pallas Staudinger, 1886
 Melitaea solona Alphéraky, 1881
 Melitaea sultanensis Staudinger, 1886
 Melitaea turanica Erschoff, 1874phoebe/Cinclidia group Melitaea aetherie (Hübner, 1826) – aetherie fritillary
 Melitaea collina Lederer, 1861
 Melitaea consulis Wiltshire, 1941
 Melitaea gina Higgins, 1941
 Melitaea kuchi Wyatt, 1961
 Melitaea phoebe Denis & Schiffermüller, 1775 – knapweed fritillary (type of Cinclidia)
 Melitaea pseudosibina Alberti, 1969
 Melitaea punica Oberthür, 1876
 Melitaea scotosia Butler, 1878
 Melitaea sibina Alphéraky, 1881
 Melitaea telona Christoph, 1893 (formerly in M. phoebe or M. punica)
 Melitaea turkmanica Higgins, 1940

</div>Mellicta group Melitaea alatauica Staudinger, 1881
 Melitaea ambigua Ménétriés in Schrenck, 1859
 Melitaea asteria (Freyer, 1828) – little fritillary
 Melitaea athalia (Rottemburg, 1775) – heath fritillary (type of Mellicta)
 Melitaea aurelia Nickerl, 1850 – Nickerl's fritillary
 Melitaea britomartis Assmann, 1847 – Assmann's fritillary
 Melitaea caucasogenita Verity, 1930
 Melitaea centralasiae (Wnukowsky, 1929) (sometimes in M. menetriesi)
 Melitaea deione Geyer, 1832 – Provençal fritillary

 Melitaea menetriesi Caradja, 1895
 Melitaea nevadensis Oberthür, 1904
 Melitaea parthenoides Keferstein, 1851 – European meadow fritillary, meadow fritillary
 Melitaea plotina Bremer, 1861
 Melitaea rebeli Wnukowsky, 1929
 Melitaea varia (Meyer-Dür, 1851) – Grisons fritillary
 Melitaea westsibirica (Dubatolov, 1998)Incertae sedis
 Melitaea kunlunensis Kudrna & Mracek, 1994
 Melitaea oorschoti Eckweiler, 2008
 Melitaea paludani Clench & Shoumatoff, 1956
 Melitaea tangigharuensis de Freina, 1980
 Melitaea wiltshirei Higgins, 1941

Footnotes

References 

 Fauna Europaea (FE) (2009): Melitaea. Version 2.1, 22 December 2009. Retrieved 9 February 2011.
 Pitkin, Brian & Jenkins, Paul (2004a): Butterflies and Moths of the World, Generic Names and their Type-species – Melitaea. Version of 5 November 2004. Retrieved 9 February 2011.
 Pitkin, Brian & Jenkins, Paul (2004b): Butterflies and Moths of the World, Generic Names and their Type-species – Mellicta. Version of 5 November 2004. Retrieved 9 February 2011.
 Savela, Markku (2009): Markku Savela's Lepidoptera and Some Other Life Forms – Mellicta. Version of 17 August 2009. Retrieved 9 February 2011.
 Savela, Markku (2010): Markku Savela's Lepidoptera and Some Other Life Forms – Melitaea. Version of 2 May 2010. Retrieved 9 February 2011.

 
Melitaeini
Butterfly genera
Taxa named by Johan Christian Fabricius